Bars Bek (Old Turkic: 𐰉𐰺𐰽:𐰋𐰏, ; 637 - 710/711, Son River) or Inanch Alp Bilge, was a first khagan of the Yenisei Kyrgyz Khaganate.

Reign 
Nothing is known about Bars Bek's early reign, except minor information fragments contained within Orkhon and Yenisei inscriptions.

During his reign, he was believed to be hostile to the Göktürks until he married a younger daughter of Ilterish Qaghan and was appointed as a lesser khagan ruling over Az and Kyrgyz tribes.

In the late 7th century, according to Takeshi Osawa, Bars Bek mediated talks between Suoge and the Emperor Zhongzong of Tang. According to Klyashtorny, he sent an ambassador named Eren Ulug to the Tibetan Empire in an attempt to form an alliance but was unsuccessful.

Title 
According to Sergei Klyashtorny, Bars Bek's anointed name was Inanch Alp Bilge and was mentioned as such in Yenisei inscriptions. Turkish historian Saadeddin Gömeç argued against this.

Death 
After news of the triple alliance reached Tonyukuk, he decided to eliminate the Kyrgyz first. Roads to Kyrgyz lands were blocked by heavy snow, forcing them to find a guide. They first crossed Ak Termel (modern Ona - a tributary of Abakan). However, after ten nights of searching for a way out, their guide became lost and was executed on the orders of Qapaghan. After a few days, they arrived at Kyrgyz headquarters and launched a night attack on Bars Bek, killing him. A memorial stele was erected after his death, on the left side of the Abakan river.

He was succeeded by his son and Bilge Khagan's nephew.

Legacy 

A commemorative coin honouring Bars Bek was issued by the National Bank of the Kyrgyz Republic in 2010. In 2017, a monument to Bars Bek was erected in Osh.

References 

Founding monarchs
7th-century Turkic people
711 deaths
637 births
8th-century murdered monarchs
Turkic rulers
History of Kyrgyzstan
Military leaders